Peblephaeus satoi is a species of beetle in the family Cerambycidae. It was described by Hiroshi Makihara in 2003.

References

Lamiini
Beetles described in 2003